The Nisichawayasihk Cree Nation (NCN; ; formerly the Nelson House First Nation) is a Cree First Nations community centered in Nelson House, Manitoba, Canada. Its main reserve is Nelson House 170.

Nisichawayasihk means 'where three rivers meet' in Cree and describes Nelson House, which is located at the convergence of the Burntwood, Footprint, and Rat Rivers.

History
The people of Nisichawayasihk are largely ancestral descendants of indigenous Cree peoples who have populated the Canadian Shield region of northern and central Canada since the retreat of the glaciers about 10,000 years ago.

The people of Nisichawayasihk refer to themselves as the Nisichawayasi Nehethowak (Cree from where three rivers meet). The term Rocky Cree (Asiniskaw Ithiniwak- People from where there is an abundance of rocks) is also used to refer to the people of Nisichawayasihk.

Largely left alone by the Government of Canada during initial colonization and settlement of Western Canada.  In the mid-1870s, the Indigenous peoples of the Lake Winnipeg area were interested in making a treaty with the Government of Canada. They had heard about the concessions offered to the Indigenous nations of Treaties 1 to 4 (see Numbered Treaties), and subsequently demanded the government provide similar economic assistance, provisions of tools and protection against the encroachment of outsiders (such as surveyors and settlers) on their territories.  Treaty 5 was the response from the government that ensure the homelands of the Cree were protected for their use. Treaty 5, a document which established that Nisichawayasihk Cree Nation members and their descendants were guaranteed certain rights and benefits.

Governance and population
Nisichawayasihk Cree Nation is governed by an elected chief and council. Elections are held pursuant to NCN's own democratic election code. The last election in Nelson House was in August 2018. The Chief is currently Marcel Moody, a former Councillor.

About 3,000 members of the NCN live in Nelson House and the remaining 2,100 off the reserve lands. Until 2005, the community of South Indian Lake on the shores of Southern Indian Lake was also part of the NCN. In December 2005, this community of about 1,100 persons separated from the Nisichawayasihk Cree Nation to form the O-Pipon-Na-Piwin Cree Nation.

With a population of approximately 5,200, the NCN is a large and widespread community.  Nelson House consists of eleven areas, which are known to the residents as Westwood, School Road, Hillside, Dogpoint, R.C. Point, Little R.C. Point, New Area, Hart's Point, Michelle Point, Bay Road and Moore's Bay.

Like most of rural Canada where the population is sparse, there is no local infrastructure for water and sewage treatment.  Rural residents in Canada must use private wells or take water from a lake or river and have their own septic tank.

Hydroelectric development and impacts
During the 1960s and 1970s, the Government of Manitoba and Manitoba Hydro began the Nelson River Hydroelectric Project, centered on the Churchill and Nelson rivers. The project included the Churchill River Diversion, which directly affected Nisichawayasihk members living at Nelson House and at South Indian Lake. Consequently, large areas of traditional hunting, fishing and trapping lands were flooded. The people of South Indian Lake were forcibly relocated to their current location.

The Nisichawayasihk Cree Nation (NCN) is a signatory to the Northern Flood Agreement (NFA) between Canada (the federal government), Manitoba Hydro, the Province of Manitoba and several First Nations Communities. In 1996, NCN signed an NFA Implementation Agreement. Using settlement proceeds paid pursuant to this implementation agreement, NCN purchased the Mystery Lake Motor Hotel in the nearby city of Thompson.  In 2006, the NCN signed a Project Development Agreement with Manitoba Hydro regarding the Wuskwatim hydroelectric project on the Burntwood River, about 30 km from Nelson House. Wuskwatim generates about 200 MW of electricity. The NCN was involved in the construction of the project and, as a partner in the project, will receive a share of the future revenues.  This arrangement is the first of its kind in Manitoba.

In 2006, the Atoskiwin Training and Employment Centre (ATEC) opened its doors in Nelson House. ATEC is also a Manitoba first. It trains NCN members and other aboriginals for northern hydro projects and other job opportunities.

Reserve lands
Nelson House consists of four NCN reserves, totalling  in size:

 Nelson House 170 — located on the north shore of Footprint Lake; totalling  in size
 Nelson House 170A — located south of the west end of Footprint Lake; totalling  in size
 Nelson House 170B — located south of the central part of Footprint Lake; totalling  in size
 Nelson House 170C — located on the north-east shore of Footprint Lake; totalling  in size

Urban reserve
In early February 2004, the nearby city of Thompson, Manitoba, announced its approval to the NCN to convert a parcel of property to Treaty Land. This was possible due to shortages in land area controlled by NCN under the Treaty Land Entitlement agreement in the mid-1990s. This event marked one of the few transitions from privately-owned land, purchased by a First Nations community, to an urban reserve.

This plan was quietly discussed between city and band administration since the narrowly-lost plebiscite held in Thompson on 18 September 2001. With a 45% voter turnout for the plebiscite, and amid allegations of inappropriate voter disqualifications, the "no" side won by a margin of 250 votes. During the three years following the plebiscite, the majority of Thompson City Councillors publicly stated that the results of the vote were not binding upon city council, as the council was elected to act in the best interests of the citizens of Thompson.

Thompson City Council approved NCN’s plan for the urban reserve on 7 February 2005.

In April 2016, the reserve received an additional  of land.

References

External links
"Nisachawayasihk Cree Nation – History: Respecting Our Past…Creating A Bright Future" (2016)
Manitoba Hydro hosted Wuskwatim Agreement (PDF)
Map of Nelson House 170 at Statcan

Cree
Cree governments
Algonquian ethnonyms
Hudson's Bay Company trading posts
First Nations governments in Manitoba
First Nations in Northern Region, Manitoba